Laura Martin Rose (September 18, 1862May 6, 1917) (born Laura Marcella Martin) was a historian and propagandist for the Ku Klux Klan employed by the United Daughters of the Confederacy.

Biography

Rose was born in 1862 near Pulaski, Tennessee, the town where the Ku Klux Klan would be formed three years later. After her marriage to Solon Edward Franklin Rose, she often identified herself with her husband's name, as Mrs. S. E. F. Rose.

Rose wrote a pamphlet, called Origins of the Ku Klux Klan, sold as a fundraiser by the Daughters of the Confederacy, of which she was Mississippi division president. The funds were to be used to erect a Confederate monument at Jefferson Davis's home. The pamphlet promoted the Lost Cause narrative of the American Civil War and presented racist acts of violence as heroism.

Encouraged by the success of the pamphlet, Rose expanded it into a textbook titled The Ku Klux Klan, or Invisible Empire. Rose hoped that the book would inspire southern boys to commit acts of violence against African American men who she perceived as a threat to the virtue of white women. The book was unanimously endorsed both by the Daughters of the Confederacy at their 1913 convention in New Orleans, and the Sons of Confederate Veterans in Jacksonville in 1914, with aim of promoting it in schools throughout the American South.

Rose became historian-general of the United Daughters of the Confederacy in 1916. She died in 1917.

Martin Methodist College is named for her grandfather Thomas Martin (1799–1870), who established the college in his will. As her book describes, some of the earliest meetings of the Klan were held at her grandfather's house.

Re-founding of the Klan

Rose's 1914 textbook contributed to mythologizing and glorifying the Ku Klux Klan, which at that time was a nearly-extinct regional organization. It was one of a number of works of the era that would lead to the Klan's re-founding in 1915.

According to journalist Michelle Serrano, Rose's textbook served to propagate white supremacy and helped to bring about the Jim Crow era of racist laws.

Further reading
 Cox, Karen L. Dixie's Daughters. The United Daughters of the Confederacy and the Preservation of Confederate Culture University Press of Florida, 2003.

References

1862 births
1917 deaths
Members of the United Daughters of the Confederacy
American Ku Klux Klan members
People from Giles County, Tennessee
American women historians